The All Species Foundation (stylized as ALL Species Foundation) was an organization aiming to catalog all species on Earth by 2025 through their All Species Inventory initiative.  The project was launched in 2000  by Kevin Kelly, Stewart Brand and Ryan Phelan. Along with other similar efforts, the All Species Foundation was promoted as an important step forward in expanding, modernizing and digitizing the field of taxonomy. The Foundation started with a large grant from the Schlinger Foundation but had difficulty finding continued funding.  the project is no longer active and "hands off [its] mission to the Encyclopedia of Life".

The All Species Foundation received some critique for its approach to defining and identifying species. An open letter expressed concern over the species problem, a fundamental issue in taxonomy of what exactly defines a species. The letter argued that failing to acknowledge and account for this fundamental issue could undermine the use of the database for conservation and biodiversity preservation.

See also 
 Catalogue of Life
 Encyclopedia of Life
 Earth BioGenome Project
 Open Tree of Life
 Tree of Life Web Project
 Wikispecies

References 

Organizations established in 2001
Scientific research foundations
Species
Taxonomy (biology) organizations